Hans Thomson (14 June 1888 – 23 May 1963) was a German fencer. He competed at the 1912 and 1928 Summer Olympics. He was the twin brother of Julius Thomson, who also competed for Germany at the Olympics in fencing.

References

External links
 

1888 births
1963 deaths
German male fencers
Olympic fencers of Germany
Fencers at the 1912 Summer Olympics
Fencers at the 1928 Summer Olympics
German twins
Sportspeople from Offenbach am Main
Twin sportspeople
20th-century German people